The women's freestyle 55 kilograms at the 2004 Summer Olympics as part of the wrestling program were held at the Ano Liosia Olympic Hall, August 22 to August 23.

The competition held with an elimination system of three or four wrestlers in each pool, with the winners qualify for the semifinals and final by way of direct elimination.

Schedule
All times are Eastern European Summer Time (UTC+03:00)

Results

Elimination pools

Pool 1

Pool 2

Pool 3

Pool 4

Classification 5–8

Final round

Final standing

 Mabel Fonseca of Puerto Rico originally placed 5th, but was disqualified after she tested positive for Stanozolol.

References

Official Report

Women's Freestyle 55 kg
Olym
Women's events at the 2004 Summer Olympics